Dansul or gamju, translated as sweet wine, is a milky (or cloudy) rice wine made with rice, glutinous rice, and nuruk (fermentation starter). Due to the incomplete fermentation of the rice, the wine has relatively low alcohol content (2‒3% ABV) and sweet and slightly tangy notes.

Preparation 
Steamed rice and/or glutinous rice is mixed with nuruk (fermentation starter), lightly pounded, and heated in water until the temperature reaches .

See also 
Jiuniang – Chinese equivalent of Dansul
Amazake – Japanese equivalent of Dansul

References 

Korean alcoholic drinks
Rice wine